South Bank Colleges is a further education college in the London Borough of Lambeth. It was formed in 1992 from three former institutions – Vauxhall College of Building and Further Education, Brixton College of Further Education, and South London College (previously known as Norwood Technical College). The college serves just under 10,000 students from its two campuses at Clapham and Brixton as of 2019. The Nine Elms campus is currently undergoing development and this third site will specialise in the provision of STEAM (Science, Technology, Engineering, Arts, and Maths). South Bank Colleges joined London South Bank University (LSBU) Group on 31 January 2019, and became one of only three national pilots designed to bring Further and Higher Education together. Now, South Bank Colleges comprises Lambeth College (Clapham Campus), Lambeth College (Brixton Centre) and London South Bank Technical College (Nine Elms Campus).

Transfer to South Bank Colleges 
Lambeth College transferred to South Bank Colleges on 31 January 2019. South Bank Colleges (SBC) was established by London South Bank University (LSBU) to operate further education provision (16-19 yrs) in the LSBU family of educational institutions. As part of LSBU Group, Lambeth College is building a local education model that has technical and applied learning at the heart of its educational philosophy. The Group comprises: London South Bank University; Lambeth College (a wholly owned subsidiary of South Bank Colleges); University Academy of Engineering South Bank and South Bank University Technical College (South Bank Academies, Multi-Academy Trust)

Locations
The two sites currently in operation are:
 Clapham (main site) 
 Nine Elms (Opening soon)
 Brixton

Courses 
The college offers NVQ, City and Guilds, CPCAB, UAL, NCFE, OCNLR, ESOL, Foundation Degree, Access, Online and BTEC courses in many subjects. GCSEs in English and Maths are also offered for students who lack these qualifications or wish to retake them.

History
It was created by an amalgamation of three colleges in 1992. South London College was originally known as Norwood Technical College opening in the 19th century.

Lambeth College underwent an overhaul in 2012, becoming an employability focused college with the priority of finding students employment in Lambeth. This change came complete with a new logo and motto for the college along with the planned addition of many new courses and removal of A-levels.

At its previous full inspection in 2012, Ofsted gave Lambeth College a grade of 4 (defined as "Inadequate"). In a re-inspection monitoring visit in the same year, Ofsted concluded that the college had made "reasonable progress" in the areas explored during the visit, with "self-assessment and improvement planning" making "significant progress". At a Learning and Skills inspection of the college in 2013, Ofsted gave Lambeth College a grade of 3 (defined as "requires improvement"). Ofsted stated, in a 2015 re-inspection, that "learners make good progress in the development of their professional and vocational skills and knowledge; the large majority progress to the next stage of their training or to employment making "significant progress"[2]

2014 strike
On 3 June 2014, members of the University and College Union (UCU) at Lambeth College began indefinite strike action over plans by management to introduce a new contract for staff joining after 1 April 2014. UCU members claim that the new contract will leave them with bigger workloads, but less sick pay and fewer holidays. In addition to the contracts dispute, activists also claimed erroneously that there were plans to permanently close the Brixton centre when in fact a rebuild is planned. The new Brixton site will be shared with two new free schools the first of which opened in September 2014. The college sold the land to the Department of Education to reduce debts, which were created due to the redevelopment the Clapham site in 2012 to include a mock beauty salon, mock restaurant and swimming pool. Supporters of the strikers include Neil Tennant and Ken Loach. Striking staff returned to work on 9 July 2014, although the dispute had not been resolved. This was due to a court case which the college management took against the strikers, ruling that the Strike did not have legal grounds to continue indefinitely.

References

External links 
 

Further education colleges in London
Education in the London Borough of Lambeth
Educational institutions established in 1992
1992 establishments in England